Guillermo Vilas defeated Adriano Panatta 6–1, 6–4, 6–4 to win the 1975 ATP Buenos Aires singles competition. Vilas was the defending champion.

Seeds
A champion seed is indicated in bold text while text in italics indicates the round in which that seed was eliminated.

  Guillermo Vilas '(Champion)
  Adriano Panatta (Final)Draw

Key
 R – Retired
 WO – Walkover
 NB: All rounds up to but not including the semifinals were the best of 3 sets. The semifinals and final were the best of 5 sets.''

Final

Section 1

Section 2

External links
 1975 ATP Buenos Aires Singles draw

Singles
1975 in Argentine tennis